Darevskia lindholmi is a lizard species in the genus Darevskia. It is endemic to Ukraine.

References

Darevskia
Endemic fauna of Ukraine
Reptiles described in 1962
Taxa named by Mykola Szczerbak